Colville Lake is the 20th largest lake in Canada's Northwest Territories.

The only community on the lake, Colville Lake, which is the Sahtu Dene village of 126 and is located on the southeast shore, along with Colville Lake/Tommy Kochon Aerodrome and Colville Lake Water Aerodrome. Like the community it is named for Andrew Colvile.

See also
List of lakes in the Northwest Territories

References

Lakes of the Northwest Territories